The Campeonato Nacional de Liga de Segunda División, also known as LaLiga 2, and commercially known as LaLiga SmartBank for sponsorship reasons, is the men's second professional association football division of the Spanish football league system. Administrated by the Liga Nacional de Fútbol Profesional, it is contested by 22 teams, with the top two teams plus the winner of a play-off promoted to LaLiga and replaced by the three lowest-placed teams in that division.

History
This championship was created in 1929 by the Royal Spanish Football Federation. The league has been national, single-table except for a period from 1949 to 1968 in which it was regionalized into two North and South groups. Since 1984 it has been organized by the Liga Nacional de Fútbol Profesional.

In 2006, the Liga Nacional de Fútbol Profesional agreed to a ten-year sponsorship agreement with the banking group BBVA. Segunda División was thereby rebranded as 'Liga BBVA'. Two years later, as the BBVA sponsorship was extended to the Primera División (which received the Liga BBVA commercial name), the Segunda División was then renamed as 'Liga Adelante'. Another banking group, Banco Santander, took over the sponsorship of both tiers in 2016, upon which the Segunda División was renamed 'La Liga 1|2|3', before being renamed 'LaLiga Smartbank' in time for the 2019–20 season.

Since the 2010–11 season, a play-off for the third and last promotion slot has been played between the teams that finished 3rd to 6th (reserve teams are not eligible for promotion).

League format
The league contains 22 teams that play each other home and away for a 42-match season.  Each year three teams are promoted to La Liga.  The top two teams earn an automatic promotion.  The third team to be promoted is the winner of a play-off between the teams that finished 3rd to 6th (reserve teams are not eligible for promotion). The play-offs comprise two-legged semi-finals followed by a two-legged final. The bottom four are relegated to Primera Federación.

Stadia and locations

Team changes

All-time standings

Segunda División seasons

Notelist

Champions and promotions

Italics: shared titles
*Championships won by Málaga CF and CD Málaga

Media coverage

Spain

Sponsorship names for seasons
 Liga BBVA (2006–2008)
 Liga Adelante (2008–2016)
 LaLiga 1|2|3 (2016–2019)
 LaLiga SmartBank (2019–present)

See also
List of La Liga broadcasters

Notes

References

External links

Official website
The Rec.Sport.Soccer Statistics Foundation list of "Segunda División" Champions

 
2
Spain
1929 establishments in Spain
Sports leagues established in 1929